Kyrsteniopsis is a genus of Mexican flowering plants in the family Asteraceae.

 Species
 Kyrsteniopsis congesta R.M.King & H.Rob. - Guerrero
 Kyrsteniopsis cymulifera (B.L.Rob.) R.M.King & H.Rob. - San Luis Potosí, Guanajuato
 Kyrsteniopsis dibollii R.M.King & H.Rob. - San Luis Potosí, Veracruz, Puebla, Oaxaca
 Kyrsteniopsis nelsonii (B.L.Rob.) R.M.King & H.Rob. - Oaxaca, Chiapas, México State, Jalisco, 	Michoacán, Guerrero, Colima

 formerly included
see Adenocritonia Critonia Pseudokyrsteniopsis 
 Kyrsteniopsis eriocarpa (B.L.Rob. & Greenm.) B.L.Turner - Critonia eriocarpa (B.L.Rob. & Greenm.) R.M.King & H.Rob.
 Kyrsteniopsis heathiae (B.L.Turner) B.L.Turner - Adenocritonia heathiae (B.L.Turner) R.M.King & H.Rob.
 Kyrsteniopsis iltisii (R.M.King & H.Rob.) B.L.Turner- Critonia iltisii R.M.King & H.Rob.
 Kyrsteniopsis perpetiolata (R.M.King & H.Rob.) B.L.Turner - Pseudokyrsteniopsis perpetiolata R.M.King & H.Rob.
 Kyrsteniopsis spinaciifolia (DC.) B.L.Turner - Critonia spinaciifolia (DC.) R.M.King & H.Rob.

References

Asteraceae genera
Endemic flora of Mexico
Eupatorieae